Sanderson High School may refer to:
 Jesse O. Sanderson High School
 Sanderson High School (Texas)
 Sanderson High School, East Kilbride